Felicetti is an Italian surname. Notable people with the surname include:

 Dino Felicetti (born 1970), Italian-Canadian ice hockey player
 Elke Felicetti (born 1970), Italian speed skater
 Luca Felicetti (born 1981), Italian ice hockey player 

Italian-language surnames